François Hamille (3 September 1812, Montreuil-sur-Mer - 20 November 1885) was a French Bonapartist politician. He was a member of the National Assembly from 1871 to 1876 and of the Chamber of Deputies from 1876 to 1885, sitting with the Appel au peuple parliamentary group, and a Senator in 1885.

References

1812 births
1885 deaths
People from Montreuil, Pas-de-Calais
Politicians from Hauts-de-France
Appel au peuple
Members of the National Assembly (1871)
Members of the 1st Chamber of Deputies of the French Third Republic
Members of the 2nd Chamber of Deputies of the French Third Republic
Members of the 3rd Chamber of Deputies of the French Third Republic
French Senators of the Third Republic
Senators of Pas-de-Calais